Singh is a title, middle name or surname that means "lion" in various South Asian and Southeast Asian communities. Traditionally used by the Hindu Kshatriya community, it eventually became a common surname adopted by different communities including Rajputs, Jats, Bhumihars, Koeri, Dusadh, Gurjars, Yadavs and Sikhs. It was later mandated in the late 17th century by Guru Gobind Singh (born Gobind Rai) for all male Sikhs as well, in part as a rejection of caste-based prejudice. It has also been adopted by several castes and communities. As a surname or a middle name, it is now found throughout the world across communities and religious groups, becoming more of a title than a surname.

Etymology and variations 

The word "Singh" is derived from the Sanskrit word सिंह (IAST: siṃha) meaning "lion", and is used in the sense "hero" or "eminent person".

Several variants of the word are found in other languages:
 In Bengali, the name is written as সিনহা (Sinha) or  সিংহ (Siṁhô) which also means lion, however the name is pronounced as Shingh.
 In Burmese, it is spelled  (thiha), derived from the Pali variant siha.
 In Chinese, Shīzi (狮子) means lion.
 In Gujarati, it is spelled as સિંહ (Sinh) and pronounced . Another variant is Sinhji, where the suffix of respect 'ji' is added.
 In Indonesia and Malaysia, Singa or Singha, means lion.
 In Japanese, Shishi (狮子) means lion.
 In Kannada the name is simha and written as ಸಿಂಹ.
 In Magahi, the name is written as सिंह and is used by people of dominating castes.
 In Maithili, the name is written as सिंह and both Singh and Sinha are used interchangeably.
 In Malayalam, simham (സിംഹം) means lion.
 In Meitei (officially called Manipuri), the name is written and pronounced as "Singh", although many Meiteis are shifting back to the traditional naming system.
 In Odia, the name is written as ‘ସିଂ’ or ‘ସିଂହ’ ( or ). 
 In Singhala, the name is written  and pronounced .
 In Tamil, the name is Singham written as சிங்கம்.
 In Telugu, the word for lion is simham (సింహం).
 In Thailand, singha is known as sing (สิงห์), meaning "lion".
Variations include Simha and Sinha in Bihar.

History 

Originally, the Sanskrit word for lion, variously transliterated as Simha or Singh was used as a title by Kshatriya warriors in northern parts of India. The earliest recorded examples of the names ending with "Simha" are the names of the two sons of the Western Satraps ruler Rudraraman in the second century CE. Jayasimha, the first ruler of the Chalukya dynasty to bear the title Simha, ruled around 500 CE. The Vengi branch of the Chalukyas continued using Simha as the last name till the eleventh century. The Rajputs started using Singh in preference to the classical epithet of "Varman". Among the Rajputs, the use of the word Simha came into vogue among the Paramaras of Malwa in 10th century CE, among the Guhilots and the Kachwahas of Narwar in the 12th century CE, and the Rathores of Marwar after the 17th century.

By the sixteenth century, "Singh" had become a popular surname among Rajputs. It was adopted by the Sikhs in 1699, as per the instructions of Guru Gobind Singh in order to create a parallel system of aristocratic titles being used by the neighboring Rajput hill chiefs of Anandpur Sahib. Singh is used by all baptized male Sikhs, regardless of their geographical or cultural binding; the women use Kaur.

In the 18th century, several groups started using the title "Singh". These included the Brahmins, the Kayasthas and the Baniyas of what are now Uttar Pradesh and Bihar. In the 19th century, even the Bengal court peons of the lower castes adopted the title "Singh". Bhumihars, who originally used Brahmin surnames, also started affixing Singh to their names. In Bihar and Jharkhand, the surname came to be associated with power and authority, and was adopted by people of multiple castes, including Brahmin zamindars. Citing Kshatriya status, Ahirs (Yadavs), Kushwaha (Koeri) and Kurmis also use 'Singh' as part of their names. Many Muslim Shins also used the surname "Sing".  Some Jains had also adopted "Singh" in addition to various Hindu castes.

People belonging to several other castes and communities have also used Singh as a title, middle name or a surname; these include non-Sikh Punjabis, Gujjars (e.g. Nirbhay Singh Gujjar), Brahmins (e.g.Lakshmeshwar Singh), Marathas (e.g. Pratap Singh Rao Gaekwad) and Hindu Jats, (e.g. Bhim Singh Rana), Sikh Jats,(e.g. Maharaja Ranjit Singh), Kushwaha (Maurya), (e.g. Babu Singh Kushwaha), and the Bhil people (an Adivasi ethnic group). The surname 'Singh' is used by many caste groups in Bihar. The name is also found among the Indian diaspora.

Usage 

"Singh" is generally used as a surname  or as a middle name/title (e.g. Mahendra Singh Dhoni). When used as a middle name, it is generally followed by the caste, clan or family name.
Rajputs may have "Singh" as a middle name or last name (e.g. Manish Singh Parmar). Numerous Yadavs also use this as their middle name (e.g. Mulayam Singh Yadav). To stop the practice of caste system in Sikhism, some Sikhs append "Khalsa" to Singh (e.g. Harinder Singh Khalsa). Some Sikhs and Rajputs add the names of their native villages instead (e.g. Harcharan Singh Longowal, after Longowal, Pratap Singh Khachariyawas after Khachariyawas). In order to create a casteless society, many first generation Indians and Nepalis changed their surnames to "Singh", which is now a common, neutral and non caste specific surname.

Originally, a common practice among the Rajput men was to have "Singh" as their last name, while Rajput women had the last name 'Kanwar'. However, now, many Rajput women have Singh in their name (e.g. Prashanti Singh) as well.

Outside South Asia 

A section of around a million adherents of Sikhism that live abroad in Western countries only keep Singh or Kaur as their last name. This has caused legal problems in immigration procedures, especially in Canada. For a decade, the Canadian High Commission in New Delhi stated in letters to its Sikh clients that "the names Kaur and Singh do not qualify for the purpose of immigration to Canada", requiring people with these surnames to adopt new ones. The ban was denounced by the Sikh community, after which the Citizenship and Immigration Canada announced it was dropping the policy, calling the whole issue a misunderstanding based on a "poorly worded" letter.

See also
 List of people with surname Singh
 Singh v Canada, a Supreme Court of Canada case on the applicability of Charter rights to refugee claimants
 Sinha
 Kaur

References 

Indian surnames
Pakistani names
Titles in India
Sikh names
Punjabi-language surnames